Calogero (from the , a familiar term for a monk) is common given name and family name, and a place name of Italian origin.

Variants
(Masculine): Calocero
(Hypocoristic): Calò, Gero, Gerino
Feminine: Calogera, Calocera

Variants in other languages
 (Kalogeros)
, 

 (Kaloger)
, 
, Calógerio,

Origin and diffusion
A second interpretation, not generally accepted, is that the second element is the Greek  (grain), according to which the name would mean "good grain".

Historically, in the ambit of Greek Orthodoxy, the term caloyer is used as a name for a monk or a hermit, in a manner that translates as "brother" or "monk", a significance that is retained in Modern Greek.

The name is traditionally found in and is characteristic of Sicily, bestowed by the cultus of Saint Calogerus the Anchorite, a monk and hermit near Sciacca; in the province of Agrigento, Calogero is the third-most widespread masculine name, but it is well-attested in all the rest of the island.

Feast days
The feast day is celebrated on June 18 in honour of Saint Calogerus, exorcist and hermit in Sicily. Other feast dates recorded for the name are:
February 11, Saint Calogerus, Bishop of Ravenna and confessor
April 18, Saint Calocerus, Roman soldier and martyr at Albenga under Hadrian
19 May, Saint Calocerus the Eunuch, brother of Saint Parthenius, martyred under Decius, commemorated together with Parthenius

People

Mononym 
Calogero (singer) (born 1971 in Échirolles as Calogero Joseph Salvatore Maurici), French singer-songwriter

Given name 
Calogero Bagarella (1935–1969), Italian criminal and member of the Sicilian Mafia
Calogero "Jerry" Calà (born 1951), Italian comedian and filmmaker
Calogero "Charly" Chiarelli (born 1948), Italian-Canadian writer, storyteller, actor and musician
Calogero Minacore (1910–1993), also known as Carlos "The Little Man" Marcello, Italian-American mafioso who became the boss of the New Orléans crime family
Calogero "Chazz" Palminteri (born 1952), American actor, screenwriter and producer; descended from immigrants from Agrigento, Sicily
Calogero "Don Calò" Vizzini (1877–1954), historical Mafia boss of Villalba in the Italian province of Caltanissetta, Sicily

Surname 
Fiorenza Calogero (born 1978), Italian singer and actress
Francesco Calogero (born 1935), Italian physicist
Calogero conjecture, minority interpretation of quantum mechanics (attributed to Francesco Calogero)
Calogero–Degasperis–Fokas equation, the nonlinear partial differential equation (jointly attributed to Francesco Calogero)
, Italian philosopher, thinker, activist, and Partito d'Azione politician
Pascal F. Calogero Jr. (1931–2018), American judge

Fictional 
Calogero "C" Anello, the son / main character in A Bronx Tale
Calogero "Clay" Appuzzo is a character in Showtime's drama "I'm Dying Up Here" and is portrayed by Sebastian Stan
Calogera "Al" Culcher is a personality in numerous comedy stylings of Aldo, Giovanni & Giacomo
Calogero Sedara is a character in the romance Il Gattopardo of Giuseppe Tomasi di Lampedusa
Calogero Di Spelta is a character in the comedy La grande magia by Eduardo De Filippo
Calogero (called Calò) is a character in The Godfather and The Godfather: Part III, portrayed by Franco Citti

References

Bibliography

Italian masculine given names